George Schmoll (25 November 1870 – 20 October 1942) was a New Zealand cricketer. He played first-class cricket for Auckland and Wellington between 1903 and 1913.

See also
 List of Auckland representative cricketers

References

External links
 

1870 births
1942 deaths
New Zealand cricketers
Auckland cricketers
Wellington cricketers
Cricketers from Oamaru